The House of Rheged (Welsh pronunciation: [ˈr̥ɛɡɛd]) or the House of Rhun was an informal royal dynasty who ruled in the brittonic Kingdom of Rheged. The line is traced back to Coel Hen whose descendants are often referred to as the Coeling. The dynasty includes Urien, King of Rheged and his son Sir Ywain a Knight of the Round Table in Arthurian legend.

Coel Hen ruled the majority of Northern England after the fall of the Western Roman Empire. His domain was partitioned between his children, leading to his great-grandson, Meirchion Gul, in the late 5th century, likely being the first of his descendants to exclusively rule Rheged. The line would continue as kings until Princess Rhiainfellt married King Oswiu of Northumbria, when the land would be incorporated into the Anglic, Kingdom of Northumbria.

Etymology 
The origin of the name Rheged has been described as "problematic". One Brittonic-language solution is that the name may be a compound of rö-, a prefix meaning "great", and cę:d meaning "wood, forest" (c.f. Welsh coed) although the expected form in Welsh would be *Rhygoed. If association of the name with cę:d is correct, the prefix may be rag-, meaning "before, adjacent to, opposite". Derivation from the element reg, which with the suffix -ed has connotations of "generosity", is another possibility.

History 
It is possible that either Gorwst Letlwm or Ceneu ruled in Rheged. However, it is more likely that Meirchion Gul was the first king of the area specifically. The Kingdom was almost certainly passed to Cynfarch Oer, however, the throne may have originally passed to his brother Elidyr Lydanwyn, as is claimed the Gwynedd version of Hywel Dda's 'Welsh laws'. Cynfarch's epithet 'oer' actually meant 'cold' but is better translated as 'unwelcoming'. Cynfarch was well remembered by his own descendants who were referred to as the 'Cynferchyn' in his honour. His son, Urien Rheged, is no doubt the most famous member of the House. He fought several times in his life against the Anglo-Saxons such as: Battles of Gwen Ystrad and Alt Clut Ford, that are celebrated in the praise poems to him by Taliesin, preserved in the Book of Taliesin.

King Urien joined with other northern kings, Rhydderch Hael "the Generous" of Strathclyde and two other descendants of Coel, Gwallog mab Llaenog and Morgant Bwlch. They defeated the Angles and besieged them on Lindisfarne but, according to the Historia Brittonum, Urien was assassinated at the behest of Morgant Bwlch who was jealous of his power. A man called Llofan Llaf Difo is said to have killed him in a small river.

The king had at least five sons, named Owain, Rhiwallon, Elffin, Rhun 'Baladr Bras' and Pasgen. The eldest of them succeeded him. In time, the line would pass to the son of Rhun, Royth (Rhaith), and die out after Royth's daughter Rhiainfellt married King Oswiu of Northumbria, when the land would be incorporated into the Anglic, Kingdom of Northumbria.

Southern Rheged 
A second royal genealogy exists for a line, perhaps of kings, descended from Cynfarch Oer's brother: Elidir Lydanwyn. According to Bonedd Gwŷr y Gogledd Elidir's son, Llywarch Hen, was a ruler in North Britain in the 6th century. He was driven from his territory by princely in-fighting after Urien's death and was perhaps in old age associated with Powys. However, it is possible, because of internal inconsistencies, that the poetry connected to Powys was associated with Llywarch's name at a later, probably 9th century, date. Llywarch is referred to in some poems as king of South Rheged, and in others as king of Argoed, suggesting that the two regions were the same. Searching for Llywarch's kingdom has led some historians to propose that Rheged may have been divided between sons, resulting in northern and southern successor states. The connections of the family of Llywarch and Urien with Powys has suggested to some, on grounds of proximity, that the area of modern Lancashire may have been their original home.

List of Rheged Rulers 

 Meirchion Gul
 Elidyr Lydanwyn?
 Cynfarch Oer
 Urien Rheged
 Owain?
 Riwallon?
 Elffin?
 Rhun?
 Royth Rheged

References

External links 

 Koch, John T, ed. (2006). Celtic culture: a historical encyclopedia. Santa Barbara, CA: ABC-CLIO. ISBN 978-1-85109-440-0.

Hen Ogledd
Welsh royal houses